The 2020 Youngstown State Penguins football team represented Youngstown State University as a member of the Missouri Valley Football Conference during the 2020–21 NCAA Division I FCS football season. They were led by first-year head coach Doug Phillips and played their home games at Stambaugh Stadium.

Previous season

The Penguins finished the 2019 season 6–6, 2–6 in MVFC play to finish in eighth place.

Schedule

References

Youngstown State
Youngstown State Penguins football seasons
Youngstown State Penguins football